Jamie Kompon (born September 18, 1966) is a Canadian former professional ice hockey defenceman. He now is an assistant coach for the Florida Panthers of the NHL He was previously the head coach and general manager for the Portland Winterhawks of the Western Hockey League (WHL). He was fired from the team on Friday April 1, 2016 following a first round sweep to the Everett Silvertips.

Kompon served as an assistant coach with the Los Angeles Kings from 2008-2012. Kompon won the Stanley Cup in 2011-2012 as a member of the Kings.

On July 17, 2012, the Chicago Blackhawks hired Kompon as an assistant coach under head coach Joel Quenneville. Kompon won his second Stanley Cup with the Chicago Blackhawks in 2013, winning his second straight Cup in as many years.

On July 9, 2014, Kompon was hired as the head coach and general manager of the Portland Winterhawks of the WHL. He was let go at the end of the 2015–2016 season.

On July 2, 2016, Kompon was hired as an assistant coach for the Winnipeg Jets.

References

External links

1966 births
Living people
Canadian ice hockey coaches
Canadian ice hockey defencemen
Chicago Blackhawks coaches
Cincinnati Cyclones (ECHL) players
Hampton Roads Admirals players
Ice hockey people from Ontario
Los Angeles Kings coaches
Portland Winterhawks coaches
St. Louis Blues coaches
St. Louis Vipers players
Sportspeople from Thunder Bay
Winnipeg Jets coaches
Winston-Salem Thunderbirds players